Richard Leggat (born 28 August 1960) is a New Zealand cricketer. He played in 22 first-class and 15 List A matches for Canterbury from 1979 to 1984.

See also
 List of Canterbury representative cricketers

References

External links
 

1960 births
Living people
New Zealand cricketers
Canterbury cricketers
Cricketers from Christchurch